Severino Varela Puente (14 September 1913 – 29 July 1995) was a Uruguayan footballer who played as a striker. With 15 goals, he is Uruguay's all-time top scorer at the Copa América.

Career
Varela started his playing career in 1932 with River Plate Montevideo. In 1935, he signed for Peñarol where he was part of the team that won four successive league titles between 1935 and 1938.

Varela was part of Uruguay squad which won 1942 South American Championship, and remainis as third joint top scorer in the history of Copa América.

In 1942, Varela joined Argentine side Boca Juniors for $32.800. Boca also transferred Emeal and Laferrara to Peñarol as part of the transaction. During the first year of his career in the club of La Ribera, Varela continued living and working in Uruguay (where he shipped each Sunday after the match). Due to the many goals he had scored for Boca Juniors in that year, the club offered him to sign a new contract with a much better salary, but under the condition he had to move to Buenos Aires to live there and to train with the rest of the squad. Varela refused the offer explaining that he could not leave his current job, because, unlike football, it would be his job for the rest of his life.

 
As a footballer, Varela was a great header, skilled to control the ball, with a fierce attitude to play. He also never missed when shooting a penalty kick. His wearing of a white beret on the field gave him a distinctive range. During his tenure in Boca Juniors, he scored 43 goals within 3 years. 16 of them were headers, 14 from penalty kicks (he did not miss anyone) and 13 of free-kicking shots.

Varela gained recognition amongst Boca Juniors' fans because of his goals to River Plate (playing a total of 6 derbies and scoring in 5). The most remembered of his goals happened in September 26, 1943, when Varela headed the ball after a long pass by Carlos Sosa, diving into the goal and scoring before the ball went outside the field. This goal (defined by Crónica newspaper as El golazo del misterio - The great goal of mystery) allowed Boca to win that match 1-0 and therefore the Xeneizes became new Argentine champions, acclaiming Varela as its new great idol.

After winning the titles of 1943 and 1944 with Boca Juniors, the club asked him for the salary he wanted to earn: Varela replied that "he would not take the money he could not win by himself". He left Boca Juniors as a free agent.

Once his run in Boca Juniors was finished, Varela returned to Peñarol where he played out his career.

Career statistics

International
Source:

Honours
Peñarol
Uruguayan Primera División: 1935, 1936, 1937, 1938

Boca Juniors
Argentine Primera División: 1943, 1944

Uruguay
South American Championship/Copa América: 1942

References

External links

  Boca Juniors statistics
  Boca Juniors profile

1913 births
1995 deaths
Footballers from Montevideo
Uruguayan people of Galician descent
Uruguayan footballers
Association football forwards
Uruguay international footballers
Peñarol players
Club Atlético River Plate (Montevideo) players
Boca Juniors footballers
Uruguayan Primera División players
Argentine Primera División players
Uruguayan expatriate footballers
Expatriate footballers in Argentina
Copa América-winning players